Dziarečyn is a village that had a significant Jewish Polish population before the II WW. It was part of the Nowogródek Voivodeship of Poland before 1945 but is now in the Grodno Region of Belarus.

External links 
 

Villages in Belarus
Populated places in Grodno Region
Nowogródek Voivodeship (1507–1795)
Slonimsky Uyezd
Nowogródek Voivodeship (1919–1939)
Holocaust locations in Belarus